Bernardo Albeiro Suaza Arango (born 28 November 1992 in Retiro, Antioquia) is a Colombian cyclist, who currently rides for UCI Continental team . He was named in the startlist for the 2017 Vuelta a España.

Major results

2014
 1st  Overall Giro della Valle d'Aosta
 5th Overall Ronde de l'Isard
2018
 8th Overall Tour of Xingtai
1st  Mountains classification
 9th Overall Tour of China II
 10th Klasika Primavera
2020
 1st Stage 1 Vuelta a Colombia
2022
 7th Time trial, National Road Championships

Grand Tour general classification results timeline

References

External links

1992 births
Living people
Colombian male cyclists
Sportspeople from Antioquia Department